The Somerset Rebels were a British speedway team based in Highbridge, Somerset. Founded in 2000, the club competed in the British SGB Championship until 2019. Their home track was located at the Oak Tree Arena.

History
The club's stadium, The Oak Tree Arena, was a purpose-built speedway stadium ready for the 2000 season. The club entered the Conference League (division 3) on foundation and finished 3rd in their inaugural 2000 Speedway Conference League season.

After winning both the Conference Trophy and Conference League KO Cup in 2001 they moved up to the Premier League (division 2) in 2002. After establishing themselves in the Premier League the club won their first trophy in the division after winning the Premier League Fours Championship at Workington in 2005. The club came close to winning the competition again in both 2006 and 2007 but finished as runners-up in both to Workington and Isle of Wight respectively. The Rebels have kept up an impressive record in the competition and have placed inside the top four from 2005 to 2011.

The 2006 season saw Somerset reach the Premier League Knockout Cup Final for the first time, finishing as runners up to King's Lynn over two legs. The Rebels repeated this feat in 2007, making the final for a second time, but once again they had to be content with the runners-up spot as King's Lynn won the trophy for the third year in a row.

The 2008 season saw a major change in the club's line up after their number one rider for the past three seasons, Magnus Zetterstrom, was not retained. The Somerset management looked for a more solid line up given the greater emphasis on away wins and he was replaced by Jason Doyle from Elite League team Poole. After completing their line up, Ritchie Hawkins sustained serious injuries when riding in an indoor meeting in Germany and was ruled out of the saddle for the whole season. The club signed experienced American international, Brent Werner, as replacement. the club suffered a further setback when Australian rider Tom Hedley informed the club that he had decided against riding in the UK for the season, German Henning Loof was signed as his replacement. Loof found points difficult to come by, and was replaced by the Rebels management by fellow German Matthias Kröger in mid-April. The 2008 season proved to be successful; the team finished second the Premier League table behind the Edinburgh Monarchs after a season long battle with the Scottish side. The Rebels took the challenge to the final heat of their last league match of the season at Birmingham. Somerset won the Premier League Knockout Cup for the first time in their history. After winning the first leg of the final at Workington 43–46, the Rebels won the return leg at the Oak Tree Arena 52-41 for a 98-84 aggregate victory. Additionally, Somerset finished runners up in the Premier League Pairs Championship which was held at their own Oak Tree Arena track, and followed that up with third place in the Premier League Fours Championship at Workington.

Prior to the 2009 season, the team was purchased by Bill Hancock the owner of the Oak Tree Arena. In December 2009, Rebels rider Emil Kramer was killed in a road accident in his native Sweden. In his honor, the riders wore Blue and Yellow race suits for the entire 2010 season with Kramer's initials embroidered on the collar. The club also tried staged a memorial meeting prior to the start of the 2010 season but it was rained off.

The 2012 season saw the Rebels achieve one of their most successful seasons since their formation. The club won the Premier League Cup, beating Ipswich over two legs in the final whilst losing out on the Premier League Championship after losing in the Play-Off Final, after finishing third in the table, to Scunthorpe by a single point over two legs.

In 2013, Steve Bishop announced that he would step down as team manager leaving the responsibility to Garry May.

On Friday 31 May 2013, The Rebels broke their duck of never winning the Premier League Pairs Championship on home shale by defeating Scunthorpe in the final. After being knocked out of the Premier League Cup at the earliest stage, the Rebels went on to lift the Premier League KO Cup for the second time in their history. They defeated Workington by a single point on aggregate in the first round and then faced Edinburgh in the semi final. The semi final turned out to be an epic contest between the 2 teams and after 2 legs, the aggregate score was level at 90-90 meaning the tie had to be replayed. The Rebels dominated the replay and went on to face Rye House in the final. Again, the Rebels dominated the tie over both legs and lifted their second piece of silverware of the season.

The Rebels finished top of the Premier League table and so had first pick of opponents in the play off semi finals. The Rebels picked Redcar and Newcastle and progressed through to the final after winning 3 of the 4 semi final games. The Rebels were to meet Edinburgh in the final after they beat Workington and Ipswich in their semi final group. As with the first staging of the KO Cup encounter, the grand final was closely contested. The Rebels managed to keep the scores close after the first leg at Edinburgh, losing narrowly by 2 points 45–43. The Rebels won the second leg 49-44 giving them an aggregate win of just 3 points and making the 2013 season the most successful ever for the club.

2014 saw the Rebels pick up more silverware. The Rebels defeated Newcastle to win the Premier League Shield, a 2-legged match contested by the previous season's champions and KO cup winners. The Rebels then won the Premier League Fours at Peterborough, the first time since 2005, after losing in controversial circumstances in the final of the Premier League Pairs to Edinburgh. The Rebels and the Monarchs dominated the league in 2014 and after overcoming their respected play-offs, met in the grand final for a second season in succession. It was to be heartbreak for the Rebels as, like in 2012, they would lose the 2-legged tie by a single point on aggregate.

In late 2016, the club announced that it would be moving up into the newly formed SGB Premiership for the 2017 season. In their first top flight season the Rebels endured a tough campaign, finishing sixth overall.
In 2018, the club announced that they had signed 2017 world champion Jason Doyle as their number 1, following his shock release by Swindon Robins. Doyle captained the Rebels to their first top flight trophy, defeating Kings Lynn Stars 98-82 on aggregate in the Final of the Premiership Knock-Out Cup.

In November 2018, after two seasons in the top flight, the Rebels announced that they would be moving down to the SGB Championship, the 2nd tier of British Speedway, for the 2019 season. They reached third in the league that year. After sitting out the 2020 season due to the COVID-19 pandemic the promotion announced that they would not be running in 2021 despite already having named a squad. On 26 May 2021 the owners formally announced that they had sold the land and there would be no more racing at the site.

Season summary

Riders previous seasons

2020 team

 Rory Schlein
 Luke Becker
 Ben Barker
 Josh Bates
 Anders Rowe
 Zach Cook
 Nathan Stoneman

2019 team

 Chris Harris
 Rory Schlein
 Nick Morris
 Nico Covatti
 Anders Rowe
 Luke Harris
 Nathan Stoneman
Also Rode:

2018 team

Also Rode:

2017 team

Also Rode
(released)
(released)
(released)

2016 team

2015 team

Also Rode

2014 team

2013 team

Also Rode

2012 team

Also Rode

2011 team

Also Rode:
 (released)
 (short-term injury replacement)
 (short-term injury replacement)
 (released)

2010 team

Also Rode:
 (Released)
 (With-held services)
 (Retired)
 (Injured)
 (Injured)
 (Released)
 (Released)

2009 team

 

Also Rode:

 (Released)
 (Injured)
 (No.8)

2008 team

Also Rode:

 was injured before start of the season

Club honours
SGB Championship Fours Championship Winners: 2019
SGB Premiership Knockout Cup Winners: 2018
Premier League Championship Winners: 2013, 2016
Premier League Knockout Cup Winners: 2008, 2013, 2015
Premier Shield Winners: 2014, 2016
Premier League Cup Winners: 2012, 2016
Premier League Pairs Championship Winners: 2013, 2016
Premier League Fours Championship Winners: 2005, 2014
Conference Trophy Winners: 2001
Conference Knockout Cup Winners: 2001

Individual Honours
Premier League Riders Championship:Magnus Zetterstrom 2006
Premier League Riders Championship:Sam Masters 2011
SGB Premiership Riders Championship: Jason Doyle 2018
Premier League Champions' Chase: Magnus Zetterstrom 2005

References

Speedway Premier League teams
SGB Championship teams
Sport in Somerset
Defunct British speedway teams
Sports clubs established in 2000
Sports clubs disestablished in 2021
2000 establishments in England
2021 disestablishments in England